The Rockhill Trolley Museum is a museum and heritage railway in Rockhill Furnace, Pennsylvania that collects and restores trolley, interurban, and transit cars. Founded in 1960, the museum operates what has been historically referred to as the Shade Gap Electric Railway to demonstrate the operable pieces in its collection. "Shade Gap" refers to the name of a branch of the East Broad Top Railroad, from whom the museum leases it property.

The first car acquired by the museum in 1960 is Johnstown Traction #311.  Recent acquisitions include Public Service Coordinated Transport (later New Jersey Transit), Newark, NJ Presidents' Conference Committee (PCC) Car #6 and Iowa Terminal Railroad Snow Sweeper #3.

The museum formerly operated under its corporate name, Railways to Yesterday. It changed to its current name to acknowledge and enhance its relationship with, and provide mutual promotional support to, its hometown.

The museum is open from May through October and for special holiday events. For the latter—including Easter, Pumpkin Festival in October, and Christmas in Coal Country—the museum partners with the East Broad Top Railroad, which is across the street. While the two organizations are not formally affiliated and do not cross-honor tickets, the railroad sells tickets for the combined events with the trolley museum, and the two organizations share volunteers and labor expertise.

Roster

References

External links
 Rockhill Trolley Museum website

1960 establishments in Pennsylvania
Museums established in 1960
Railroad museums in Pennsylvania
Heritage railroads in Pennsylvania
Museums in Huntingdon County, Pennsylvania
Street railway museums in the United States